Measure of a Man is the debut studio album by American country music artist Kevin Sharp. The debut single, "Nobody Knows" went to number one on both the American and Canadian country charts. The next two singles, "She's Sure Taking It Well" and If You Love Somebody" both charted in the top ten while the last single, "There's Only You" failed to reach the top 40. The album has been certified gold by both the RIAA and CRIA. John Batdorf of the 1970s duo Batdorf & Rodney performs background vocals on this album.

Track listing

Personnel 
As listed in liner notes
 John Batdorf - background vocals
 Joe Chemay - bass guitar
 David Foster - keyboards
 Chris Farren - background vocals, keyboards, mandolin, nylon string guitar
 Larry Franklin - fiddle
 Paul Franklin - steel guitar
 John Hobbs - keyboards, piano
 Dann Huff - electric guitar
 Paul Leim - drums
 Greg Leisz - lap steel guitar, Dobro
 Greg Mathieson - organ
 Cary Park - electric guitar
 Kevin Sharp - lead vocals, background vocals, hand claps 
 Jeffrey Steele - background vocals
 Biff Watson - acoustic guitar
 Scott Wojahn - background vocals

Chart performance

Album

Singles

Sources 

1996 debut albums
Asylum Records albums
Kevin Sharp albums
Albums produced by Chris Farren (country musician)